Auaké is a Native South American nation of the Amazon rainforest of Venezuela and Brazil. They were sedentary slash-and-burn farmers, which requires periodic relocation as soil becomes exhausted, and were also hunters, fishers and gatherers. They spoke Arutani. Heavily influenced culturally by the Carib, they adopted agriculture sometime after the 16th century, and further acculturation followed European contact. They are found along the Paraguay River and are now considered a subgroup of the Shiriana people. In 1998 they numbered just 30 in Venezuela and 22 native language speakers in Brazil.

References

Indigenous peoples in Venezuela
Indigenous peoples in Brazil
Indigenous peoples of the Guianas